Jørn Sørensen (born 17 October 1936) is a retired Danish association football striker. He played 31 games and scored six goals for the Denmark national football team, and won a silver medal at the 1960 Summer Olympics. He started his career with Danish club KB, before moving abroad to play professionally for FC Metz in France, Scottish clubs Greenock Morton and Rangers, as well as AC Bellinzona and US Giubiasco in Switzerland.

References

External links

Danish national team profile

1936 births
Living people
Danish men's footballers
Denmark international footballers
Danish expatriate men's footballers
Expatriate footballers in France
Expatriate footballers in Scotland
Kjøbenhavns Boldklub players
FC Metz players
Ligue 1 players
Ligue 2 players
Greenock Morton F.C. players
Rangers F.C. players
Footballers at the 1960 Summer Olympics
Olympic footballers of Denmark
Olympic silver medalists for Denmark
Danish football managers
AC Bellinzona managers
Olympic medalists in football
People from Nibe
Danish expatriate sportspeople in Scotland
Medalists at the 1960 Summer Olympics
Association football forwards
Scottish Football League players
Sportspeople from the North Jutland Region
Danish expatriate sportspeople in Switzerland
AC Bellinzona players
Association football player-managers
Danish expatriate football managers
Expatriate footballers in Switzerland
Expatriate football managers in Switzerland